The Kola Román is a Colombian soft drink that was invented in the city of Cartagena, Colombia in 1865 by Don Carlos Román. At first it was similar to a champagne soda, but was reinvented in the early 1900s by Don Henrique Pio Román.

Kola Román is bottled and manufactured by Panamco FEMSA Colombia as related in its bottle.
Kola Román is historically preferred in the Colombia's Caribbean region and it is one of the oldest sodas in the world.

Cola brands
Colombian brands
Colombian cuisine
1865 establishments in Colombia